Lynn Julia Mester (born 27 March 1992) is a former German footballer who played for Bundesliga club Bayer 04 Leverkusen.

Career

Club

Lynn Mester joined Bayer Leverkusen for the 2009/10 season, from the youth of Westfalia Osterwick. After competing in second division 2. Bundesliga South for the initial season, the team was promoted to the Frauen Bundesliga for the 2010/11 Bundesliga season. Although primarily played in midfield, Mester was top scorer of her team with 18 goals. The club and Mester agreed to immediate separation in January 2011.

National team

Mester played a total of 39 games for the youth teams of the German Women's National Football Team. She won the European championship with the German U-17 national team in both 2008 and 2009 and finished third at the U-17 World Cup 2008 in New Zealand.

Personal life

Mester is the younger sister of football player Ina Lehmann , who plays for SGS Essen. She is the cousin of Mathias Mester, a javelin and discus thrower, who is multiple world champion and competes for the athletic division of German sports club Bayer Leverkusen. She was previously in a relationship with football player Christian Clemens from 1. FC Köln and FC Schalke 04.

Mester qualified as an office clerk through an apprenticeship at Bayer AG and currently works for a recruiting company.

Honours
Club level

2. Bundesliga South with Bayer Leverkusen: Winner 2010

National team
 FIFA U-17 Women's World Cup: Third place 2008
 UEFA Women's Under-17 Championship: Winner 2008, 2009

References

1992 births
Living people
German women's footballers
Women's association football forwards
People from Coesfeld
Sportspeople from Münster (region)
Footballers from North Rhine-Westphalia